The Mongolian national rugby union team represents Mongolia in international rugby union play. Mongolia is a member of the International Rugby Board (IRB), and has yet to play in a Rugby World Cup. The Mongolian Rugby Football Union (MRFU), which governs the sport of rugby in the country, was established in 2003.

The first ever official match of Mongolia was played on 9 June 2009 in Tashkent, Uzbekistan, against Kyrgyzstan, finishing with a respectable 21–38 loss. This match took place as part of the second regional division of the 2009 Asian Five Nations. From 2010, Mongolia will compete within the newly introduced Division Four of the tournament, with the possibility of promotion.

Match Report

Kyrgyzstan: 38
Tries: Alexsandr Zolotukhim (3), Vladimir Salembayev, Sergey Samykin, Penalty Try
Conversions: Victor Zolotukhin (4) 

Mongolia: 21
Tries: Zagdsuren Lkhagvatsezen, Enkhbat Dash-ochiz, Belegt Dambazavjaa
Conversions: Austin D. Gansukh (3)

Overall record
Below is table of the representative rugby matches played by a Mongolia national XV at test level up until 16 May 2019.

See also
 Rugby union in Outer Mongolia

External links
 Mongolia Rugby Union Official Site
 Mongolia on IRB.com
 Report of the Mongolia-Kyrgyzstan Match
 Mongolia on rugbydata.com

Asian national rugby union teams
Rugby
Rugby union in Mongolia